Trapania brunnea is a species of sea slug, a dorid nudibranch, a marine gastropod mollusc in the family Goniodorididae.

Distribution
This species was described from New South Wales, Australia. It has also been reported from Victoria, Tasmania and New Zealand.

Description
This goniodorid nudibranch is translucent pale brown with a meshwork pattern of darker brown covering most of the body apart from some irregular patches around the gills and rhinophores and along the midline of the back. The lateral papillae, gills and rhinophores are mostly translucent pale brown, with some brown markings.

Ecology
Trapania brunnea feeds on Entoprocta which often grow on sponges and other living substrata.

References

  Burn R. (2006) A checklist and bibliography of the Opisthobranchia (Mollusca: Gastropoda) of Victoria and the Bass Strait area, south-eastern Australia. Museum Victoria Science Reports 10:1–42

Goniodorididae
Gastropods described in 1987